Ethyl butylacetylaminopropionate (trade name IR3535) is an insect repellent which is applied topically to prevent bites and stings from mosquitos, ticks, and other insects. It is a colorless and almost odorless oil, has efficacy against a broad range of insects, and is reasonably biodegradable.

Chemistry 
Ethyl butylacetylaminopropionate is a derivative of non-proteinogenic amino acid beta-alanine.

References

External links 
 
 Tick Bite Prevention & the Use of Insect Repellents

Biopesticides
Insect repellents
Acetamides